Mee Pwar is Burmese film director who won the Myanmar Motion Picture Academy Awards for best director with the film Zaw Ka Ka Nay The(Dancing the Zawgyi Dance) in 2009.

Filmography

Film 

 Yan Thu 2020
 Problem (Myanmar) 2019
 Kyar Tot The Lal Mg Sagar
 The Enemy (Myanmar)
 Angel of Eden (Burmese Movie)
 Sweet Vengeance for Love 2017
 POST MYANMORE AWARDS 2015 THANK YOU
 Into The Hills
 Zaw-Ka Ka Nay Thi (Dancing the Zawgyi Dance) 2009
 Colorsone Lesson

Awards and nominations

References

External links 

Year of birth missing (living people)
Living people
Burmese film directors
Burmese film producers
University of Yangon alumni
People from Yangon